Cap-Brûlé is a Canadian rural community located in Westmorland County, New Brunswick.

It is an unincorporated community located on the Northumberland Strait immediately east of the community of Pointe-du-Chêne.

History

Notable people

See also
List of communities in New Brunswick

References

Communities in Westmorland County, New Brunswick
Communities in Greater Shediac